The Best of James Taylor is the fourth compilation album by American singer-songwriter James Taylor released by Warner Bros. Records in 2003. The same album was released in Europe as You've Got a Friend: The Best of James Taylor. 

The album emphasizes Taylor's recordings for the label; fourteen of the twenty tracks on the album are from his time with Warner Bros. It contains one previously unreleased track, "Bittersweet", recorded for this release. It entered the Billboard 200 album chart on April 26, 2003, at number 11, with sales of approximately 73,500 copies. It remained on the chart for 42 weeks. It was awarded a certified gold record on December 17, 2003, and a platinum record on April 15, 2005, by the RIAA.

Track listing
All songs were written by James Taylor, except where noted.
"Something in the Way She Moves" – 2:27
"Sweet Baby James" – 2:53
"Fire and Rain" – 3:25
"Country Road" – 3:30
 Single version, previously unreleased on any James Taylor album.
"You've Got a Friend" (Carole King) – 4:30
"You Can Close Your Eyes" – 2:32
"Long Ago and Far Away" – 2:22
"Don't Let Me Be Lonely Tonight" – 2:37
"Walking Man" – 3:35
"How Sweet It Is (To Be Loved by You)" (Brian Holland, Lamont Dozier, Eddie Holland) – 3:37
"Mexico" – 3:00
"Shower the People" – 4:33
"Golden Moments" – 3:32
"Steamroller" – 5:06
 1975 live version.
"Carolina in My Mind" – 4:00
 1976 version.
"Handy Man" (Otis Blackwell, Jimmy Jones) – 3:20
"Your Smiling Face" – 2:48
"Up on the Roof" (Gerry Goffin, King) – 4:22
"Only a Dream in Rio" – 5:03
"Bittersweet" (John Sheldon) – 3:44
 A previously unreleased song, recorded specifically for this album in early 2003.

Personnel

Musicians

James Taylor – vocals, acoustic guitar, electric guitar
Carole King – piano
Red Rhodes – steel guitar (on "Sweet Baby James")
John London – bass (on "Sweet Baby James")
Bobby West – double bass (on "Fire and Rain")
Russ Kunkel – drums, percussion
Danny Kortchmar – electric and acoustic guitars, congas
Leland Sklar – bass
Joni Mitchell – background vocals
Craig Doerge – piano (on "Don't Let Me Be Lonely Tonight")
Michael Brecker – tenor saxophone (on "Don't Let Me Be Lonely Tonight")
David Spinozza – electric and acoustic guitars (on "Walking Man")
Kenneth Ascher – electric piano (on "Walking Man")
Andy Muson – bass (on "Walking Man")
Rick Marotta – drums (on "Walking Man")
Ralph MacDonald – percussion (on "Walking Man")
Carly Simon – harmony vocals
Clarence McDonald – piano, Fender Rhodes, hornorgan
Jim Keltner – drums (on "How Sweet It Is (To Be Loved by You)")
David Sanborn – saxophone (on "How Sweet It Is (To Be Loved by You)")
Nick DeCaro – hornorgan, voiceorgan
David Crosby – harmony vocals (on "Mexico")
Graham Nash – harmony vocals (on "Mexico")
Milt Holland – percussion (on "Mexico")
Gayle Levant – harp
Victor Feldman – vibes, orchestra bells (on "Shower the People")
Bobbye Hall – triangle (on "Golden Moments") 
Andrew Gold – background vocals, harmonium (on "Carolina in My Mind")
Dan Dugmore – steel guitar (on "Carolina in My Mind")
Byron Berline – fiddle (on "Carolina in My Mind")
Leah Kunkel – background vocals (on "Handy Man")
Waddy Wachtel – electric guitar (on "Up on the Roof")
Randy Brecker – vocals (on "Only a Dream in Rio")
Eliane Elias – vocals (on "Only a Dream in Rio")
Kenia Gould – vocals (on "Only a Dream in Rio")
Zbeto – vocals (on "Only a Dream in Rio")
Bill Payne – keyboards (on "Only a Dream in Rio")
Tony Levin – bass (on "Only a Dream in Rio")
Airto Moreira – percussion (on "Only a Dream in Rio")
Curtis King – vocals (on "Bittersweet")
John Sheldon – guitar (on "Bittersweet")
Clifford Carter – keyboards (on "Bittersweet")
Willie Weeks – bass (on "Bittersweet")
Steve Jordan – drums (on "Bittersweet")

Technical
James Taylor – Record producer (on "Only a Dream in Rio"), liner notes
Peter Asher – production
David Spinozza – production (on "Walking Man")
Lenny Waronker – production
Russ Titelman – production
Frank Filipetti – production (on "Only a Dream in Rio")
Danny Kortchmar – production (on "Bittersweet")
David McLees – compiler
Bill Inglot – remastering, except "Bittersweet"
Dan Hersch – remastering, except "Bittersweet"
Ted Jensen – remastering (on "Bittersweet")

Charts

Weekly charts

Year-end charts

Certifications

References

2003 greatest hits albums
James Taylor compilation albums
Warner Records compilation albums